Iwona Daniluk (born 8 July 1973) is a Polish biathlete. She competed in the women's relay event at the 1998 Winter Olympics.

References

1973 births
Living people
Biathletes at the 1998 Winter Olympics
Polish female biathletes
Olympic biathletes of Poland
People from Kamienna Góra